The list of ship launches in 1896 includes a chronological list of some ships launched in 1896.


References 

Sources

See also 

1896
Ship launches